The men's 50 metre breaststroke event at the 2015 European Games in Baku took place on 25 June at the Aquatic Palace.

Results

Heats
The heats were started at 09:40.

Semifinals
The semifinals were started at 17:30.

Semifinal 1

Semifinal 2

Final
The final was held at 19:03.

References

Men's 50 metre breaststroke